This page lists all described species of the harvestman suborder Cyphophthalmi. Unless otherwise noted, information is taken from Giribet's 2000 taxonomic catalogue and from Giribet et al., 2012.

Boreophthalmi

Sironidae 

 Cyphophthalmus Joseph, 1868
 Cyphophthalmus beschkovi (Mitov, 1994)
 Cyphophthalmus bithynicus (Gruber, 1969)
 Cyphophthalmus conocephalus Karaman, 2009
 Cyphophthalmus corfuanus (Kratochvíl, 1938)
 Cyphophthalmus duricorius Joseph, 1868
 Cyphophthalmus eratoae (Juberthie, 1968)
 Cyphophthalmus ere Karaman, 2008
 Cyphophthalmus gjorgjevici (Hadži, 1933)
 Cyphophthalmus gordani Karaman, 2009
 Cyphophthalmus hlavaci Karaman, 2009
 Cyphophthalmus klisurae (Hadži, 1973)
 Cyphophthalmus kratochvili Karaman, 2009
 Cyphophthalmus markoi Karaman, 2008
 Cyphophthalmus martensi Karaman, 2009
 Cyphophthalmus minutus (Kratochvíl, 1938)
 Cyphophthalmus neretvanus Karaman, 2009
 Cyphophthalmus noctiphilus (Kratochvíl, 1940)
 Cyphophthalmus nonveilleri Karaman, 2008
 Cyphophthalmus ognjenovici Karaman, 2009
 Cyphophthalmus ohridanus (Hadži, 1973)
 Cyphophthalmus paradoxus (Kratochvíl, 1958)
 Cyphophthalmus paragamiani Karaman, 2009
 Cyphophthalmus rumijae Karaman, 2009
 Cyphophthalmus serbicus (Hadži, 1973)
 Cyphophthalmus silhavyi (Kratochvíl, 1938)
 Cyphophthalmus solentiensis Dreszer, Raða & Giribet, 2015
 Cyphophthalmus teyrovskyi (Kratochvíl, 1938)
 Cyphophthalmus thracicus Karaman, 2009
 Cyphophthalmus trebinjanus Karaman, 2009
 Cyphophthalmus yalovensis (Gruber, 1969)
 Cyphophthalmus zetae Karaman, 2009
 Iberosiro de Bivort & Giribet, 2004
Iberosiro distylos de Bivort & Giribet, 2004
 Iberosiro rosae Giribet, Merino-Sáinz & Benavides, 2017
 Marwe Shear, 1985
 Marwe coarctata Shear, 1985
 Odontosiro Juberthie, 1961
 Odontosiro lusitanicus Juberthie, 1961
 Paramiopsalis Juberthie, 1962
 Paramiopsalis anadonae Giribet, Merino-Sáinz & Benavides, 2017
 Paramiopsalis eduardoi Murienne & Giribet, 2009
 Paramiopsalis ramblae Benavides & Giribet, 2017
 Paramiopsalis ramulosus Juberthie, 1962
 Parasiro Hansen and Sørensen, 1904
 Parasiro coiffaiti Juberthie, 1956
 Parasiro corsicus (Simon, 1872)
 Parasiro minor Juberthie, 1958
 Siro Latreille, 1796
 Siro acaroides (Ewing, 1923)
 Siro boyerae Giribet & Shear, 2010
 Siro calaveras Giribet & Shear, 2010
 Siro carpaticus Rafalski, 1956
 Siro clousi Giribet & Shear, 2010
 Siro crassus Novak & Giribet, 2006
 Siro exilis Hoffman, 1963
 Siro kamiakensis (Newell, 1943)
 Siro ligiae Giribet, 2017
 Siro rubens Latreille, 1804
 Siro richarti Benavides & Giribet, 2017
 Siro shasta Giribet & Shear, 2010
 Siro sonoma Shear, 1980
 Siro valleorum Chemini, 1990
 Suzukielus Juberthie, 1970
 Suzukielus sauteri (Roewer, 1916)

Stylocellidae

Fangensinae 

 Fangensis Rambla, 1994
 Fangensis cavernarus Schwendinger & Giribet, 2005
 Fangensis leclerci Rambla, 1994
 Fangensis spelaeus Schwendinger & Giribet, 2005
 Giribetia Clouse, 2012
 Giribetia insulanus (Schwendinger & Giribet, 2005)

Leptopsalidinae

 Leptopsalis Thorell, 1882
Leptopsalis beccarii Thorell, 1882
 Leptopsalis dumoga (Shear, 1993)
Leptopsalis foveolata Clouse & Schwendinger, 2012
Leptopsalis hillyardi (Shear, 1993)
Leptopsalis javana (Thorell, 1882)
Leptopsalis laevichelis (Roewer, 1942)
Leptopsalis lydekkeri (Clouse & Giribet, 2007)
Leptopsalis modesta (Hansen & Sørensen, 1904)
Leptopsalis novaguinea (Clouse & Giribet, 2007)
Leptopsalis pangrango (Shear, 1993)
Leptopsalis ramblae (Giribet, 2002)
Leptopsalis sedgwicki (Shear, 1979)
Leptopsalis sulcata (Hansen & Sørensen, 1904)
Leptopsalis tambusisi (Shear, 1993)
Leptopsalis thorellii (Hansen & Sørensen, 1904)
Leptopsalis weberii (Hansen & Sørensen, 1904)
 Miopsalis Thorell, 1890
Miopsalis collinsi (Shear, 1993)
 Miopsalis dillyi Schmidt, Clouse & Sharma, 2020
 Miopsalis globosa (Schwendinger & Giribet, 2004)
 Miopsalis gryllospeca (Shear, 1993)
 Miopsalis kinabalu (Shear, 1993)
 Miopsalis leakeyi (Shear, 1993)
 Miopsalis lionota (Pocock, 1897)
 Miopsalis mulu (Shear, 1993)
 Miopsalis pocockii (Hansen & Sørensen, 1904)
 Miopsalis pulicaria Thorell, 1890
 Miopsalis sabah (Shear, 1993)
 Miopsalis silhavyi (Rambla, 1991)
 Miopsalis tarumpitao (Shear, 1993)

Stylocellinae 

 Meghalaya Giribet, Sharma, & Bastawade, 2007
 Meghalaya annandalei Giribet, Sharma, & Bastawade, 2007
 Stylocellus Westwood, 1874
 Stylocellus lornei Clouse, 2012
 Stylocellus sumatranus Westwood, 1874

Scopulophthalmi

Pettalidae 

 Aoraki Boyer & Giribet, 2007

 Aoraki calcarobtusa (Forster, 1952)
 Aoraki calcarobtusa calcarobtusa (Forster, 1952)
 Aoraki calcarobtusa westlandica (Forster, 1952)
 Aoraki crypta (Forster, 1948)
 Aoraki denticulata (Forster, 1948)
 Aoraki denticulata denticulata (Forster, 1948)
 Aoraki denticulata major (Forster, 1948)
 Aoraki granulosa (Forster, 1952)
 Aoraki healyi (Forster, 1948)
 Aoraki inerma (Forster, 1948)
 Aoraki inerma inerma (Forster, 1948)
 Aoraki inerma stephenesis (Forster, 1952)
 Aoraki longitarsa (Forster, 1952)
 Aoraki tumidata (Forster, 1948)
 Austropurcellia Juberthie, 1988
 Austropurcellia absens Boyer & Popkin-Hall, 2015
 Austropurcellia acuta Popkin-Hall & Boyer, 2014
 Austropurcellia alata Boyer & Reuter, 2012
 Austropurcellia arcticosa (Cantrell, 1980)
 Austropurcellia barbata Popkin-Hall & Boyer, 2014
 Austropurcellia cadens Baker & Boyer, 2015
 Austropurcellia capricornia (Davies, 1977)
 Austropurcellia clousei Boyer, Baker & Popkin-Hall, 2015
 Austropurcellia culminis Boyer & Reuter, 2012
 Austropurcellia daviesae (Juberthie, 1989)
 Austropurcellis despectata Boyer & Reuter, 2012
 Austropurcellia finniganensis Popkin-Hall, Jay & Boyer, 2016
 Austropurcellia forsteri (Juberthie, 2000)
 Austropurcellia fragosa Popkin-Hall, Jay & Boyer, 2016
 Austropurcellia giribeti Boyer & Quay, 2015
 Austropurcellia megatanka Jay, Coblens & Boyer, 2016
 Austropurcellia monteithi Jay, Popkin-Hall, Coblens & Boyer, 2016
 Austropurcellia riedeli Jay, Oberski & Boyer, 2016
 Austropurcellia nuda Popkin-Hall, Jay & Boyer, 2016
 Austropurcellia scoparia Juberthie, 1988
 Austropurcellia sharmai Boyer & Quay, 2015
 Austropurcellia superbensis Popkin-Hall & Boyer, 2014
 Austropurcellia tholei Baker & Boyer, 2015
 Austropurcellia vicina Boyer & Reuter, 2012
 Austropurcellia woodwardi (Forster, 1955)
 Chileogovea Roewer, 1961
 Chileogovea jocasta Shear, 1993
 Chileogovea oedipus Roewer, 1961
 Karripurcellia Giribet, 2003
 Karripurcellia harveyi Giribet, 2003
 Karripurcellia peckorum Giribet, 2003
 Karripurcellia sierwaldae Giribet, 2003
 Manangotria Shear & Gruber, 1996
 Manangotria taolanaro Shear & Gruber, 1996
 Neopurcellia Forster, 1948
 Neopurcellia salmoni Forster, 1948
 Parapurcellia Rosas Costa, 1950
 Parapurcellia amatola de Bivort & Giribet, 2010
 Parapurcellia convexa de Bivort & Giribet, 2010
 Parapurcellia fissa (Lawrence, 1939)
 Parapurcellia minuta de Bivort & Giribet, 2010
 Parapurcellia monticola (Lawrence, 1939)
 Parapurcellia natalia de Bivort & Giribet, 2010
 Parapurcellia rumpiana (Lawrence, 1933)
 Parapurcellia peregrinator (Lawrence, 1963)
 Parapurcellia silvicola (Lawrence, 1939)
 Parapurcellia staregai de Bivort & Giribet, 2010
 Parapurcellia transvaalica (Lawrence, 1963)
 Pettalus Thorell, 1876
 Pettalus brevicauda Pocock, 1897
 Pettalus cimiciformis (Cambridge, 1875)
 Pettalus lampetides Sharma & Giribet 2006
 Pettalus thwaitesi Sharma, Karunarathna & Giribet, 2009
 Purcellia Hansen & Sørensen, 1904
 Purcellia argasiformis (Lawrence, 1931)
 Purcellia griswaldi de Bivort & Giribet, 2010
 Purcellia illustrans Hansen and Sørensen, 1904
 Purcellia lawrencei de Bivort & Giribet, 2010
 Purcellia leleupi Staręga, 2008
 Rakaia Hirst, 1925
 Rakaia antipodiana Hirst, 1925
 Rakaia collaria Roewer, 1942
 Rakaia dorothea Phillips and Grimmett, 1932
 Rakaia florensis (Forster, 1948)
 Rakaia isolata Forster, 1952
 Rakaia lindsayi Forster, 1952
 Rakaia macra Boyer and Giribet, 2003
 Rakaia magna Forster, 1948
 Rakaia magna australis Forster, 1952
 Rakaia magna magna Forster, 1948
 Rakaia media Forster, 1948
 Rakaia media media Forster, 1948
 Rakaia media insula Forster, 1952
 Rakaia minutissima (Forster, 1948)
 Rakaia pauli Forster, 1952
 Rakaia solitaria Forster, 1948
 Rakaia sorenseni Forster, 1952
 Rakaia sorenseni digitata Forster, 1952
 Rakaia sorenseni sorenseni Forster, 1952
 Rakaia stewartiensis Forster, 1948
 Rakaia uniloca Forster, 1952

Sternophthalmi

Neogoveidae 

 Brasiliogovea Martens, 1969
 Brasiliogovea aphantostylus Benavides, Hormiga, & Giribet, 2019
 Brasiliogovea chiribiqueta Benavides & Giribet, 2013
 Brasiliogovea microphaga Martens, 1969
 Brasiliogovea microstylus Benavides, Hormiga, & Giribet, 2019
 Brasiliogovea yacambuensis Benavides, Hormiga, & Giribet, 2019
 Canga DaSilva, Pinto-da-Rocha & Giribet, 2010
 Canga renatae DaSilva, Pinto-da-Rocha & Giribet, 2010
 Huitaca Shear, 1979
 Huitaca boyacanensis Benavides & Giribet, 2013
 Huitaca bitaco Benavides & Giribet, 2013
 Huitaca caldas Benavides & Giribet, 2013
 Huitaca depressa Benavides & Giribet, 2013
 Huitaca sharkeyi Benavides & Giribet, 2013
 Huitaca tama Benavides & Giribet, 2013
 Huitaca ventralis Shear, 1979
 Leggogovia Benavides & Giribet, 2019
 Leggogovia pabsgarnoni (Legg. 1990)
 Metagovea Rosas-Costa, 1950
 Metagovea disparunguis Rosas Costa, 1950
 Metagovea ligiae Giupponi & Kury, 2015
 Metagovea matapi Benavides, Hormiga, & Giribet, 2019
 Metagovea philipi Goodnight & Goodnight, 1980
 Metagovea planada Benavides, Hormiga, & Giribet, 2019
 Metasiro Juberthie, 1960
 Metasiro americanus (Davis, 1933)
 Metasiro savannahensis Clouse & Wheeler, 2014
 Metasiro sassafrasensis Clouse & Wheeler, 2014
 Microgovia Benavides, Hormiga, & Giribet, 2019
 Microgovia chenepau Benavides, Hormiga, & Giribet, 2019
 Microgovia oviformis Martens, 1969
 Neogovea Hinton, 1938
 Neogovea branstetteri Benavides, Hormiga, & Giribet, 2019
 Neogovea enigmatica Martens, 2019
 Neogovea hormigai Benavides & Giribet, 2013
 Neogovea immsi Hinton, 1938
 Neogovea kamakusa Shear, 1977
 Neogovea kartabo Shear, 1977
 Neogovea matawai Benavides, Hormiga, & Giribet, 2019
 Neogovea virginie Jocqué & Jocqué, 2011
 Parogovia Hansen, 1921
 Parogovia gabonica (Juberthie, 1969)
 Parogovia montealensis Benavides & Giribet, 2019
 Parogovia parasironoides Hiřman, Kotyk, Kotyková Varadínová,& Šťáhlavský, 2018
 Parogovia prietoi Benavides & Giribet, 2019
 Parogovia putnami Benavides & Giribet, 2019
 Parogovia sironoides Hansen, 1921
 Tucanogovea Karaman, 2014
 Tucanogovea schusteri Karaman, 2014
 Waiwaigovia Benavides, Hormiga, & Giribet, 2019
 Waiwaigovia shultzi Benavides, Hormiga, & Giribet, 2019

Ogoveidae 

 Ogovea Roewer, 1923
 Ogovea cameroonensis Giribet & Prieto, 2003
 Ogovea grossa (Hansen & Sørensen, 1904)
 Ogovea nasuta (Hansen, 1921)

Troglosironidae 

 Troglosiro Juberthie, 1979
 Troglosiro aelleni Juberthie, 1979
 Troglosiro brevifossa Sharma & Giribet, 2009
 Troglosiro juberthiei Shear, 1993
 Troglosiro longifossa Sharma & Giribet, 2005
 Troglosiro monteithi Sharma & Giribet, 2009
 Troglosiro ninqua Shear, 1993
 Troglosiro oscitatio Sharma & Giribet, 2009
 Troglosiro platnicki Shear, 1993
 Troglosiro raveni Shear, 1993
 Troglosiro sheari Sharma & Giribet, 2009
 Troglosiro tillierorum Shear, 1993
 Troglosiro urbanus Sharma & Giribet, 2009
 Troglosiro wilsoni Sharma & Giribet, 2009

Incertae sedis 

 Ankaratra Shear & Gruber, 1996
 Ankaratra franzi Shear & Gruber, 1996
 Shearogovea Giribet, 2011
 Shearogovea mexasca (Shear, 1977)

References 

Cyphophthalmi